Moldova entered the Junior Eurovision Song Contest for the first time in 2010.

On 30 June 2010, TRM announced its debut in the Junior Eurovision Song Contest. They were the first country making its debut since Armenia, Bulgaria, Georgia and Lithuania debuted in 2007. Since 2010 Moldova took part four times in the contest, including 2013.

In 2014, there were rumours about Denis Midone's return to the competition, who had previously represented Moldova in the 2012 contest. Had Moldova sent Denis to Junior Eurovision, his entry would have been the song "Spune Mi Ceva (Chemistry)", but since any possible Junior Eurovision participation were not confirmed by TRM, Moldova withdrew from the contest and Denis Midone did not return.

Participation overview

Photogallery

Commentators and spokespersons

See also
Moldova in the Eurovision Song Contest
Moldova in the Turkvision Song Contest
Găgăuzia in the Turkvision Song Contest

References

Countries in the Junior Eurovision Song Contest